Katta Shekar Reddy is an Indian journalist and editor of the Telugu newspaper Namasthe Telangana, having served in that capacity since June 2014. Reddy earlier worked with Udayam, Andhra Jyothi and Vaartha Telugu newspapers.

He also worked as Executive Editor at Mahaa TV. He joined Namasthe Telangana as its CEO in September 2010.

References

Indian political journalists
Telugu-language journalists
Indian newspaper editors
Living people
Indian male journalists
Journalists from Telangana
Year of birth missing (living people)